Case Construction Equipment (stylized as CASE Construction Equipment, commonly referred to as simply Case) is an American manufacturer of construction machinery. Along with CASE IH, Case Construction Equipment is a brand of CNH. Case produces construction equipment including excavators, motor graders, wheel loaders, vibratory compaction rollers, crawler dozers, skid steers, and compact track loaders.

Early history

The origins of Case date to 1842, when Jerome Increase Case (born in 1819) created Racine Threshing Machine Works in Racine, Wisconsin. The company produced its first portable steam engine in 1876, which is now on display at the Smithsonian Institution.

In 1957 Case made the 320 Construction King backhoe loader. Since 1969 Case has manufactured skid steers, starting in Burlington, Iowa and later moving production to Wichita.

Recent history

The company evolved into the Case Corporation, which merged with New Holland in 1999 to become CNH Global which in 2011 became CNH Industrial.

 2005: Case made its 500,000th backhoe loader and in 2010 made its 250,000th skid steer loader.
 2016: Case released the new G-Series wheel loader lineup consisting of seven new models from 521G thru 1121G.
 2017: In its 175th year in business, Case announced its facility in Wichita produced its 300,000th skid-steer loader.
 2017: At Conexpo-Con/Agg 2017 Case released the CX750D excavator.

As of May 2017, according to Trade Arabia, Case "sells a full line of construction equipment around the world, including the number one loader/backhoes, excavators, motor graders, wheel loaders, vibratory compaction rollers, crawler dozers, skid steers, compact track loaders and rough-terrain forklifts."

Products

Case was the first company to introduce the factory-integrated backhoe loader. In February 2017, the firm released an upgraded backhoe loader in Europe, which meets the Stage IV/Tier 4 Final emissions regulations.

In 2017, Case introduced the CX750D Excavator, the 'largest and most powerful machine in the CASE excavator line' according to Construction Equipment Guide.

Case also produces mini excavators.
 

Case builds and sells skid-steer loaders, used on construction sites. Such loaders are small in size and engine powered with lift arms, and fitted with labor-saving tools. Case skid-steer loaders are manufactured in Wichita, Kansas.

Case wheel loaders are used in construction and earthmoving, as well as on the farm, especially in dairies and feedlots where it is necessary to move of large amounts of material.

See also
 Case IH is CNH Industrial's global provider of agricultural equipment

References

External links
 CASE website
 CASE VIC website

CNH Industrial
Construction equipment manufacturers of the United States
Companies based in Racine, Wisconsin